

France
 Porto-Novo – 
 Porto-Novo becomes a French protectorate
 Marius Daumas, Agent (1863–1865)

Portugal
 Angola – José Baptista de Andrade, Governor-General of Angola (1862–1865)

United Kingdom
 British Guiana –
 Henry Light
 Sir Henry Barkly
Lagos Colony - Henry Stanhope Freeman, Governor of Lagos Colony (1862–1865)
Malta Colony – John Le Marchant, Governor of Malta (1858–1864)
 Newfoundland – Sir Alexander Bannerman, Colonial Governor of Newfoundland 
New South Wales – John Young, Baron Lisgar, Governor of New South Wales (1861–1867)
 Queensland – Sir George Bowen, Governor of Queensland (1859–1868)
 Tasmania – Colonel Thomas Browne, Governor of Tasmania (1862–1868)
 South Australia – Sir Dominick Daly, Governor of South Australia (1862–1868)
 Victoria 
 Sir Henry Barkly, Governor of Victoria (1856–1863)
 Sir Charles Darling, Governor of Victoria (1863–1866)
 Western Australia – John Hampton, Governor of Western Australia (1862–1868)

Colonial governors
Colonial governors
1863